Povarnitsyn is a Russian masculine surname, its feminine counterpart is Povarnitsyna. Notable people with the surname include:

 (born 1994), Russian biathlete
Rudolf Povarnitsyn (born 1962), Russian athlete

Russian-language surnames